are historic Japanese distance markers akin to milestones. Comprising a pair of earthen mounds (tsuka or zuka) covered in trees and flanking the road, they denoted the distance in ri to Nihonbashi, the "Bridge of Japan", erected in Edo in 1603. Ichirizuka were encountered and described by Engelbert Kaempfer, c.1690: "serving as a milestone are two hills, facing each other, which are raised up on both sides of the road, and planted with one or more trees."

Establishment
The Tokugawa shogunate established ichirizuka on the major roads in 1604, enabling calculation both of distance travelled and of the charge for transportation by kago or palanquin. These mounds, to be maintained by "post stations and local villages", were one component of the developing road infrastructure, which also included bridges and ferries; post stations (both shukuba, and the more informal ai no shuku); and tea-houses (chaya). However, the main aim was "official mobility, not recreational travelling": the movement of farmers and women was discouraged, and a system of passports and  maintained. By marking the distance from Edo rather than Kyoto, establishing a symbolic point of origin for all movements, the Tokugawa made of mile markers what they would later make of checkpoints: powerful reminders of the government's geopolitical ubiquity and efficacious tools in its appropriation of space.

Ichirizuka were important enough to be found on the well-known "Proportional Map of the Tokaido" by printmaker Hishikawa Moronobu (d. 1694). A traditional poem allegorically compares the ichirizuka that mark distance to the Kadomatsu marking the years of a person's life.

Survival
With the modernization of Japan in the Meiji period, many of the mounds disappeared through road-widening and construction schemes, and the survival of both is now rare. Of ichirizuka that are still extant, sixteen have been designated for protection as national Historic Sites. Of the two within Tokyo, that at Nishigahara was once threatened by a road-widening project; a movement to save it led by industrialist Shibusawa Eiichi, the "father of Japanese capitalism", is commemorated in a monument beside what is now .

See also

 Kaidō
 Station bell
 Sankin-kōtai
 Milliarium Aureum
Sukagawa Ichirizuka

Notes

References

Ichirizuka
History of road transport